Col de la Ramaz (elevation 1559 m.) is a high mountain pass in the Alps in the department of Haute-Savoie in France through which the Tour de France passed during 2003, 2010, and 2016. The road through the pass culminates slightly higher, at 1619m (5312 feet).

Appearances in the Tour de France

See also
 List of highest paved roads in Europe
 List of mountain passes

References 

Mountain passes of Auvergne-Rhône-Alpes
Mountain passes of the Alps